The 1971 Kingsport 300 was a NASCAR Winston Cup Series racing event that took place on May 23, 1971, at Kingsport Speedway in Kingsport, Tennessee.

Race report
There were 25 drivers on the starting grid; 13 drivers would fail to finish the race. Bill Hollar would finish in last-place on the first lap due to an issue with his clutch. Bill Champion received his second straight top-five finish. Richard Childress would be involved in a fire during the race while a crash would take D.K. Ulrich out of the race. 300 laps were performed in front of 3,800 live spectators. Bobby Isaac and Richard Petty were exchanging the lead for the entire race.

Isaac would go on to defeat Elmo Langley after more than 90 minutes of racing action; with Harry Hyde as the winner's crew chief. Isaac's qualifying speed of  earned him the pole position for this race. Notable crew chiefs for this race were Harry Hyde, Dale Inman, Vic Ballard and Lee Gordon.

The race car drivers still had to commute to the races using the same stock cars that competed in a typical weekend's race through a policy of homologation (and under their own power). This policy was in effect until roughly 1975. By 1980, NASCAR had completely stopped tracking the year model of all the vehicles and most teams did not take stock cars to the track under their own power anymore.

Qualifying

Timeline
Section reference: 
 Start of race: Bobby Isaac started the race in the pole position.
 Lap 1: Bill Hollar vehicle's developed problems with its clutch.
 Lap 26: An oil leak in J.D. McDuffie's vehicle ended his hopes of winning the race.
 Lap 46: Benny Parsons overheated his engine, forcing him out of the race.
 Lap 72: Richard Childress' vehicle caught on fire.
 Lap 83: Richard Petty takes over the lead from Bobby Isaac.
 Lap 85: The wiring in Earl Brooks' vehicle unravelled itself.
 Lap 87: Henley Gray's battery managed to die off while he was racing.
 Lap 89: Bobby Isaac takes over the lead from Richard Petty.
 Lap 138: Neil Castles slammed on his vehicle's brakes a bit too hard; Charlie Roberts quit the race.
 Lap 166: The rear end of Richard Petty's vehicle managed to peel off.
 Lap 186: D.K. Ulrich had a terminal crash, forcing him to withdraw from the race.
 Lap 194: The rear end of Ken Meisenhelder's vehicle came off in an unsafe manner.
 Lap 200: Transmission problems forced Dick May to exit the race prematurely.
 Lap 238: John Sears had a problem with his vehicle's ignition.
 Finish: Bobby Isaac was officially declared the winner of the event.

Finishing order

 Bobby Isaac† (No. 71)
 Elmo Langley† (No. 64)
 James Hylton† (No. 48)
 Cecil Gordon† (No. 24)
 Bill Champion† (No. 10)
 Wendell Scott† (No. 34)
 Walter Ballard (No. 30)
 Jabe Thomas† (No. 25)
 Bill Shirey (No. 74)
 Bill Seifert (No. 45)
 Frank Warren (No. 79)
 John Sears*† (No. 4)
 Ed Negre† (No. 8)
 Dick May*† (No. 67)
 Ken Meisenhelder* (No. 41)
 D.K. Ulrich* (No. 40)
 Richard Petty* (No. 43)
 Neil Castles* (No. 06)
 Charlie Roberts* (No. 77)
 Henley Gray* (No. 19)
 Earl Brooks*† (No. 26)
 Richard Childress* (No. 96)
 Benny Parsons*† (No. 72)
 J.D. McDuffie*† (No. 70)
 Bill Hollar*† (No. 28)

† signifies that the driver is known to be deceased 
* Driver failed to finish race

References

Kingsport 300
Kingsport 300
NASCAR races at Kingsport Speedway